Henning Jonathan van Aswegen  (born 11 February 1955 in Okahandja, South West Africa (now Namibia) is a former South African rugby union player.

Playing career
Van Aswegen played for the Free State, Western Province and Transvaal in the South African Currie Cup competition. He was appointed captain of Western Province for the 1985 Currie Cup season and led his team to the Currie Cup title.

Van Aswegen made his debut for the Springboks during the 1981 tour of New Zealand in the first test on 15 August 1981 at Lancaster Park in Christchurch.  He played his second and last test match for the Springboks against the South American Jaguars on 3 April 1982 at the Free State Stadium in Bloemfontein when he replaced his provincial team mate, Hempies du Toit after 27 minutes in the second half. Van Aswegen also played in eight tour matches for the Springboks.

Test history

See also
List of South Africa national rugby union players – Springbok no. 525

References

1955 births
Living people
South African rugby union players
South Africa international rugby union players
Rugby union props
Western Province (rugby union) players
Cheetahs (rugby union) players
People from Okahandja